The 1990 Continental Grass Court Championships was an men's ATP-tennis tournament held in Rosmalen, Netherlands. It was played on outdoor grass courts and was part of the ATP World Series. It was the inaugural edition of the tournament and was held from 11 June through 17 June 1990. Unseeded Amos Mansdorf won the singles title.

Finals

Singles

 Amos Mansdorf defeated  Alexander Volkov 6–3, 7–6
 It was Mansdorf's only singles title of the year and the 5th of his career.

Doubles

 Jakob Hlasek /  Michael Stich defeated  Jim Grabb /  Patrick McEnroe 7–6, 6–3

References

External links
 ITF tournament edition details
 

Rosmalen Grass Court Championships
Rosmalen Grass Court Championships
Rosmalen Grass Court Championships
June 1990 sports events in Europe